Dakshina Kerala Jami-yyathul Ulama is the principal Sunni-Shafi'i,Hanafi (Mainly Pathanamthitta,Kottayam,Idukki districts)scholarly body in central and southern Kerala (former Cochin and Travancore). The council administers mosques, institutes of higher religious learning (the equivalent of north Indian madrasas) and madrasas (institutions where children receive basic Islamic education) in central and southern Kerala.

The Ulama was established at Kollam in 1955 as "Travancore-Cochin Jamiyyathul Ulama". The body also supervises the Kerala Muslim Jama-ath Federation.

There are some reasonable criticism in social media that the Scholars are not interested in the teaching of Khuraan and Hadees rather interested in activities like street protests. The madrasa education is just basic ideas of day to day activities like five time prayer and fasting in Ramadan. Not at all interested in teaching the meaning of Khuraan and Hadees which is very important in Islam.

Due to this reason most of the youth who quit Islam(Ex Muslims of Kerala) is from Dakshina taught madrasas. The scholars are not able to prevent the quits because the Madrasa teachers are not trained to deliver the real teachings of Khuraan and Hadees.

References

External links 

Sunni Islam in India
Islam in Kerala